The Kansas Jayhawks, commonly referred to as simply KU or Kansas, are the athletic teams that represent the University of Kansas. KU is one of three schools in the state of Kansas that participate in NCAA Division I. The Jayhawks are also a member of the Big 12 Conference. KU athletic teams have won twelve NCAA Division I championships: four in men's basketball, one in men's cross country, three in men's indoor track and field, three in men's outdoor track and field, and one in women's outdoor track and field. KU basketball also has two Helms Foundation National Titles.

Mascot

Origins of "Jayhawk"

The name "Jayhawk" comes from the Kansas Jayhawker militias during the Bleeding Kansas era of the American Civil War.

The origin of the term likely goes back as far as the Revolutionary War, when it was reportedly used to describe a group associated with American Founding Father and patriot John Jay, who served in the American Revolution as well as the 1st Chief Justice of the United States as a member of the right wing Federalist Party. Jay believed in the abolition of slavery and has been described by historians as a "Christian Nationalist" and "among the most orthodox of Christians," according to Cambridge University and Oxford University professor Daniel Dreisbach and that America should be governed by Christians. In 1816, Jay wrote, "Providence has given to our people the choice of their rulers, and it is the duty, as well as the privilege and interest of our Christian nation to select and prefer Christians for their rulers." In 1776, prior to America's founding, Jay condemned slavery as a moral evil, and would be quoted as saying, "The Holy Gospels are yet to be preached to these western regions, and we have the highest reason to believe that the Almighty will not suffer slavery and the gospel to go hand in hand. It cannot, it will not be."

Because of his positions on the immorality of slavery and the need for Christianity in government, many dubbed the political and militia groups that arose over the next century that were largely Christian and militantly anti-slavery as "Jayhawkers." The name became synonymous with the state of Kansas due to many of the founders being Federalist settlers that moved to Kansas Territory from the east. The term became part of the lexicon of the Missouri-Kansas border in about 1858, during the Kansas territorial period, as these militia groups began to grow in Kansas.

Another historian of the territorial period described the jayhawkers as bands of men that were willing to fight, kill, and rob for a variety of motives that included defense against pro-slavery "Border Ruffians", abolition of slavery, driving pro-slavery settlers from Kansas Territory and their claims of land, Christianity, revenge, or plunder and personal profit.

In September 1861, the town of Osceola, Missouri was burned to the ground by Jayhawkers during the Sacking of Osceola. On the 150th anniversary of that event in 2011, the town asked the University of Kansas to remove the Jayhawk as its mascot. The university refused.

Over time, proud of their state's contributions to the end of slavery and the preservation of the Union, Kansans embraced the "Jayhawker" term. The term came to be applied to people or items related to Kansas. When the University of Kansas fielded their first football team in 1890, like many universities at that time, they had no official mascot. They used many different independent mascots, including a pig. Eventually, sometime during the 1890s, the team was referred to as the Jayhawkers by the student body. Over time, the name was gradually supplanted by its shorter variant, and KU's sports teams are now almost exclusively known as the Jayhawks. The Jayhawk appears in several Kansas cheers, most notably, the "Rock Chalk, Jayhawk" chant in unison before and during games. In the traditions promoted by KU, the jayhawk is said to be a combination of two birds, "the blue jay, a noisy, quarrelsome thing known to rob other nests, and the sparrow hawk, a stealthy hunter."

The term Jayhawker was made famous in Clint Eastwood’s movie The Outlaw Josey Wales. An older Kansas couple comes into a general store in Texas. The checker says, “The wheat is from Kansas and the molasses comes from Missouri.” Grandma says, “Well sir we'll do without the molasses, anything from Missouri has a taint about it.” Grandpa says, “Now, Grandma, you’ve got to tread lightly now that we’re here in Texas. Lot of nice elements from Missouri coming West.” Grandma responds, “Never heard of nice things from Missouri coming West, and treading lightly is not my way. We’re from Kansas, Jayhawkers and proud of it.”

The link between the term "Jayhawkers" and any specific kind of mythical bird, if it ever existed, had been lost or at least obscured by the time KU's bird mascot was invented in 1912. The originator of the  first bird mascot, Henry Maloy, struggled for over two years to create a pictorial symbol for the team, until hitting upon the bird idea. As explained by Mr. Maloy, "the term ‘jayhawk’ in the school yell was a verb and the term ‘jayhawkers’ was the noun." KU's current Jayhawk tradition largely springs from Frank W. Blackmar, a KU professor. In his 1926 address on the origin of the Jayhawk, Blackmar specifically referenced the blue jay and sparrow hawk. Blackmar's address served to soften the link between KU's athletic team moniker and the Jayhawkers of the Kansas territorial period, and helped explain the relatively recently invented Jayhawk pictorial symbol with a myth that appears to have been of even more recent fabrication. More recently, however, the University and KU fans have again embraced the history of the Jayhawker moniker, with the football team, among other Varsity teams, donning civil war themed uniforms.

Costume mascots

Jayhawks Big Jay and Baby Jay are the costume mascots used by the University of Kansas.

Another Jayhawk costume mascot was Centennial Jay, or C Jay. C Jay was created by student cartoonist Henry Maloy and featured in the University Daily Kansan in 1912. Maloy's depiction of the Jayhawk helped answer the question of what the mythical bird would look like. When asked why he gave the bird shoes Maloy responded, "Why? For kicking opponents, of course." C Jay was reintroduced as a full-sized mascot on February 25, 2012 in the final Border War against Missouri to celebrate the 100th anniversary of the Jayhawk. C Jay was used only in 2012 for the 100-year anniversary of the original Jayhawk design.

Sports sponsored

The University of Kansas officially sponsors 16 sports: 6 men's and 8 women's. There are also club-level sports for rugby, ice hockey, and men's volleyball. The school used to sponsor a wrestling team, though the sport was discontinued during the 1960s.

Basketball

Men's basketball

The Jayhawks men's basketball program is one of the most successful and prestigious programs in the history of college basketball. The Jayhawks' first coach was the inventor of the game, James Naismith. The program has produced some of the game's greatest professional players (including Clyde Lovellette, Wilt Chamberlain, Jo Jo White, Paul Pierce, and Frank Mason III, and most successful coaches (including Phog Allen, Adolph Rupp, Ralph Miller, Dutch Lonborg, John McLendon, Larry Brown, Dean Smith, Roy Williams, and Bill Self). The program has enjoyed considerable national success, having been retrospectively awarded Helms Foundation titles for the 1922 and 1923 seasons, winning NCAA national championships in 1952, 1988, 2008, and 2022, and playing in 16 Final Fours, and is one of only three programs to win more than 2,000 games. In Street & Smith's Annual list of 100 greatest college basketball programs of all time in 2005, KU ranked 4th.

Women's basketball

Kansas first fielded a women's team during the 1968–69 season. For thirty-one seasons (1973–2004) the women's team was coached by Marian Washington, who led the team to three Big Eight championships, one Big 12 Championship, six conference tournament championships, eleven NCAA Tournament appearances and four AIAW Tournament appearances. The team's best post-season result was a Sweet Sixteen appearance in 1998. Bonnie Henrickson served as head coach from 2004 to 2015, until she was fired in March 2015. Brandon Schneider was hired to replace Henrickson in April 2015.

Football

KU began playing football in 1890. The football team has had notable alumni including Gale Sayers, a two-time All-American who later enjoyed an injury-shortened yet Hall of Fame career with the Chicago Bears; John Riggins, another Pro Football Hall of Famer and Super Bowl XVII MVP with the Washington Redskins; Pro Football Hall of Famer for the Cleveland Browns, Mike McCormack. Additional notable former Jayhawks John Hadl, Curtis McClinton, Dana Stubblefield, Bobby Douglass, Nolan Cromwell, and current NFL cornerbacks Aqib Talib and Chris Harris Jr. The Jayhawks have appeared three times in the Orange Bowl, 1948, 1969 and 2008, winning in 2008. The team currently plays in Memorial Stadium (capacity 50,071), the seventh oldest college football stadium in the nation, which opened in 1921. Clint Bowen was named interim head coach after Charlie Weis was fired September 28, 2014. On December 5, 2014, David Beaty was announced as the next head football coach.

Baseball

Kansas baseball began in 1880 and has produced notable players such as Bob Allison and Steve Renko. The team has appeared in five NCAA tournaments (1993, 1994, 2006, 2009, 2014) and one College World Series (1993).

Softball
The Jayhawks softball team has appeared in seven Women's College World Series, including five straight from 1973–77, as well as 1979 and 1992.

Golf
In 1949, Marilynn Smith won the women's individual intercollegiate golf championship (an event conducted by the Division of Girls' and Women's Sports (DGWS) — which later evolved into the current NCAA women's golf championship).

Notable non-varsity sports

Rugby
Founded in 1964, Kansas Jayhawks Rugby Football Club plays college rugby in the Division 1 Heart of America conference against its many of its traditional Big 8 / Big 12 rivals such as Kansas State and Missouri. Kansas finished the 2011 year ranked 24th. Kansas rugby has embarked on international tours since 1977, playing in Europe, New Zealand, South Africa, Belgium, Holland, Scotland, England, Ireland and Argentina.
The team plays its matches at the Westwick Rugby Complex, which was funded by $350,000 in alumni donations. Kansas often hosts the annual Heart of America sevens tournament played every September, the winner of which qualifies for the USA Rugby sevens national championship. Notable University of Kansas rugby all-Americans are: Pete Knudsen 1986, Paul King 1989–90, Anthony Rio 1992, Philip Olson 1993 all American, Joel Foster 1993, Collin Gotham 1993. In 2022 the club played in the USA Rugby D1AA spring national championship game, falling to Fresno State, 22–17.

Ice hockey
Competing in the ACHA, the Kansas Jayhawks Club Ice Hockey team has seen a resurgence in popularity since the team started scheduling games against historical rivals Missouri and Nebraska, starting on an annualized basis in 2013. The team is coached by Andy McConnell.

The team's primary logo is the traditional Kansas Jayhawk logo, with the secondary logo paying homage to the Vancouver Canucks classic logo, with the outline of the state of Kansas having a hockey stick running through the middle of it.

Championships

Conference championships and titles
Big 12 Conference champions have the best conference regular season record, and titles are awarded to the winner of the postseason championship tournament. In all sports combined,  the Jayhawks have won total of 169 conference titles all-time, 24 championships since joining the Big 12. Approximately one third of those are from the Men's basketball.

 Men's basketball
The Jayhawks have won or shared an NCAA record 63 conference championships since they joined their first conference in 1907. The Jayhawks have belonged to the Big 12 Conference since it was formed, before the 1996–97 season, and dominated it, winning 12 straight conference titles dating back to 2005. Before that, the Jayhawks have belonged to the Missouri Valley Intercollegiate Athletic Association from the 1907–08 to 1927–28 seasons, the Big Six Conference from 1928–29 to 1946–47, the Big Seven Conference from 1947–48 to 1957–58, the Big Eight Conference from 1958–59 up until the end of the 1995–96 season. The Big Six and Big Seven conferences were actually the more often used names of the Missouri Valley Intercollegiate Athletic Association, which existed under that official name until 1964, when it was changed to the Big Eight.

Missouri Valley Intercollegiate Athletic Association (13)
 1908, 1909, 1910, 1911, 1912, 1914, 1915, 1922, 1923, 1924, 1925, 1926, 1927

Big Six Conference (12)
 1931, 1932, 1933, 1934, 1936, 1937, 1938, 1940, 1941, 1942, 1943, 1946

Big Seven Conference (5)
 1950, 1952, 1953, 1954, 1957

Big Eight Conference (13)
 1960, 1966, 1967, 1971, 1974, 1975, 1978, 1986, 1991, 1992, 1993, 1995, 1996

Big 12 Conference (20)
 1997, 1998, 2002, 2003, 2005, 2006, 2007, 2008, 2009, 2010, 2011, 2012, 2013, 2014, 2015, 2016, 2017, 2018, 2020, 2022

In addition to the 63 regular season conference championships, the Jayhawks have also captured 29 conference tournament championships:

Big 7 Holiday Tournament (4)
 1951, 1953, 1956, 1957,

Big 8 Holiday Tournament (9)
1962, 1964, 1965, 1966, 1968, 1970, 1974, 1977, 1978,

Big 8 Postseason Tournament (4)
1981, 1984, 1986, 1992,

Big 12 Postseason Tournament (12)
1997, 1998, 1999, 2006, 2007, 2008, 2010, 2011, 2013, 2016, 2018, 2022

 Women's basketball
 1979 – Big 8 tournament champion
 1980 – Big 8 tournament champion
 1981 – Big 8 tournament champion
 1987 – Big 8 regular season and tournament champion
 1988 – Big 8 tournament champion
 1992 – Big 8 regular season champion
 1993 – Big 8 tournament champion
 1996 – Big 8 regular season champion
 1997 – Big 12 champion

 Baseball
 1921 – MVIAA champion
 1922 – MVIAA champion
 1923 – MVIAA champion
 1949 – Big 7 Conference champion
 2006 – Big 12 tournament champion

 Soccer
 2004 – Big 12 regular season co-champion

 Softball
 2006 – Big 12 tournament champion

 Men's indoor track and field
 1922, 1923, 1934, 1950, 1952, 1953, 1954, 1955, 1956, 1957, 1958, 1959, 1961, 1962, 1966, 1967, 1968, 1969, 1970, 1971, 1975, 1977, 1978, 1980, 1981, 1982, 1983

 Women's indoor track and field
 2013

 Men's outdoor track and field
 1910, 1927, 1928, 1930, 1931, 1934, 1946, 1952, 1953, 1954, 1955, 1956, 1957, 1958, 1959, 1960, 1963, 1964, 1965, 1967, 1968, 1969, 1970, 1971, 1972, 1973, 1974, 1975, 1976, 1977, 1979, 1980, 1982

 Women's outdoor track and field
 2013

 Men's cross country
 1928, 1947, 1948, 1949, 1950, 1951, 1952, 1953, 1954, 1955, 1956, 1957, 1958, 1959, 1961, 1963, 1964, 1968, 1969

 Men's golf
 1999

 Tennis
 1979, 1992, 1993, 1994, 1995, 1996, 2019

 Women's volleyball
 2016

NCAA team championships
Kansas has won 12 NCAA team national championships:

 Men (11)
 Basketball (4): 1952, 1988, 2008, 2022
 Cross country (1): 1953
 Indoor track and field (3): 1966, 1969, 1970
 Outdoor track and field (3): 1959, 1960, 1970
 Women (1)
 Outdoor track and field (1): 2013

Other national team athletic titles
The Jayhawks have also won three national titles not awarded by the NCAA:
 Men's Bowling (1): 2004 (USBC intercollegiate champions)
 Men's Basketball (2): 1922, 1923 (Helms Athletic Foundation retrospective selections)

Rivalries

Kansas State Wildcats (Sunflower Showdown)

Kansas State University is Kansas' in-state rival. The series between Kansas and Kansas State is known as the Sunflower Showdown.

Missouri Tigers (Border War)

The 160-year-old rivalry between Kansas and Missouri began with open violence that up to the American Civil War known as Bleeding Kansas that took place in the Kansas Territory (Sacking of Lawrence) and the western frontier towns of Missouri throughout the 1850s. The incidents were clashes between pro-slavery factions from both states and anti-slavery Kansans to influence whether Kansas would enter the Union as a free or slave state. In the opening year of the war, six Missouri towns (the largest being Osceola) and large swaths of the western Missouri country side were plundered and burned by guerrilla "Jayhawkers" from Kansas. The Sacking of Osceola led to a retaliatory raid on Lawrence, Kansas two years later known as the Lawrence Massacre killing between 185 and 200 men and boys, which in turn led to the infamous General Order No. 11 (1863), the forced depopulation of several western Missouri counties. The raid on Lawrence was led by William Quantrill, a Confederate guerrilla born in Ohio who had formed his bushwhacker group at the end of 1861. At the time the Civil War broke out, Quantrill was a resident of Lawrence, Kansas teaching school.

The athletic rivalry began with a football game on October 31, 1891. Currently it is the second longest played series in Division I football and has been described as one of the most intense in the nation. However, no regular season games were scheduled after Missouri accepted an offer to join the Southeastern Conference and Kansas refused Missouri's offer to continue rivalry outside of the conference. In the basketball series Kansas leads by a large margin (172-95 KU), in football Missouri leads by a very small margin (56-55-9 MU) and baseball Missouri leads by a large margin. Regular season games have been scheduled for basketball beginning in 2020 and football in 2025 for the first time since Missouri left for the SEC.

Dormant rivalries

Nebraska Cornhuskers

Kansas had a rivalry with the Nebraska Cornhuskers, though that rivalry had more to do with who had the better sports program, with Kansas priding itself on its basketball prowess and Nebraska on its football dominance. This rivalry of sports cultures has gone dormant with Nebraska's departure for the Big Ten Conference in 2011. Prior to 2011, the football series between the 2 schools was the 3rd most played rivalry in college football behind Minnesota-Wisconsin and Kansas-Missouri. In basketball, Kansas leads the all-time series 170–71.

Notable seasons
 In 1992–1993, KU became the second NCAA Division I program to send its football team to a bowl game (Aloha Bowl), one of its basketball teams to the Final Four, and its baseball team to the College World Series in the same academic year. The first was LSU in 1985–86. 
 In the 2007–2008 football and men's basketball seasons, KU amassed a combined 49–4 record (12–1 football, 37–3 basketball), which is the most combined wins ever by an NCAA Division I program, and is also one of only two college sports programs to win a BCS Bowl game and a College Basketball National Championship in the same sports season, the other was the 2006–2007 Florida Gators who won the BCS national championship and their second consecutive basketball national championship.
 In the 2011–2012 and 2012–2013 basketball seasons, KU became the only school in the nation over those two seasons to have their men's and women's basketball teams both qualify for the Sweet 16 both seasons.

Notable athletes
This list below is for Olympic medalists and Hall of Famers in their respective sport, with a single exception. For a more comprehensive list of notable athletes see .

Athletic directors
Kansas has had 16 full-time athletic directors and 8 interim athletic directors. W. O. Hamilton was the first official athletic director. Travis Goff has served as the athletic director since 2021. Longtime men's basketball coach Phog Allen also served as athletic director for 18 years.

 W. O. Hamilton, 1911–1919
 Phog Allen, 1919–1937
 Gwinn Henry, 1938–1942
 Karl Klooz, 1943 (interim)
 Ernie Quigley, 1944–1949
 Arthur Lonborg, 1950–1963
 Wade R. Stinson, 1964–1972
 Clyde Walker, 1973–1977
 Bob Marcum, 1978–1981
 Del Shankel, 1981 (interim)
 Jim Lessig, 1982
 Del Shankel, 1982 (interim)

 Monte Johnson, 1982–1987
 Bob Frederick, 1987–2001
 Richard Konzem, 2001 (interim)
 Allen Bohl, 2001–2003
 Drue Jennings, 2003 (interim)
 Lew Perkins, 2003–2010
 Sean Lester, 2010–2011 (interim)
 Sheahon Zenger, 2011–2018
 Sean Lester – 2018 (interim)
 Jeff Long, 2018–2021
 Kurt Watson, (interim) 2021
 Travis Goff, 2021–present

See also
  – Home to the basketball teams from 1927 to 1955
 Robinson Gymnasium – Home to the men's basketball team from 1907 to 1927

References

Sources

External links